Dr Sampurnanand Multipurpose sports stadium, nicknamed Sigra Stadium, is located in Varanasi, Uttar Pradesh. The stadium is the main stadium in the city where first-class cricket matches are held since 1964 to 2003. Association football club Varanasi City FC use the stadium for home games.

History 

The ground is managed by the Government of Uttar Pradesh. This stadium is a multi-dimensional sports facility with excellent support features. 
The ground was host to a varied set of state and national level events; this complex has volleyball, association football, and kabaddi grounds. Also known as Sigra Stadium, this facility hosts a range of cultural and entertainment events of the locality as well. Training sessions of different events are held here on a daily basis and lot of youngsters from the area are the beneficiaries.

Ranji Trophy matches

Redevelopment 

A new indoor stadium is going to be constructed at Dr. Sampoornanand Sports Stadium in Sigra, Varanasi, at an estimated cost of Rs.87 crore. This indoor stadium is being built according to international standards, in which world-class indoor games can be organized well. A total of more than 20 indoor sports facilities will be provided in this stadium including swimming pool, badminton court, snooker arena. Courts and venues for all these games are being constructed under world class sporting standards. This indoor stadium building, being built under the rejuvenation of the stadium, is a total of 3 storeys including the ground floor.

More than 20 indoor games are included in this stadium.

Due to this newly constructed indoor stadium in Varanasi, the parliamentary constituency of Prime Minister Narendra Modi, the youth of the state and the country will be provided with excellent opportunities to move forward and at the same time they will be given a higher level by trained coaches. Training will also be available. Apart from this, once the stadium is ready, people in and around Varanasi will not have to go out of the city to watch international level matches. The stadium houses more than 20 indoor sports played at international level including badminton, volleyball, basketball, squash, handball, table tennis.

Redevelopment scheme implemented under smart city plan to build stadium

As the Varanasi District Officer, a redevelopment scheme has been implemented under the Smart City plan to build this stadium of international level. This indoor stadium is being constructed by rejuvenating Dr. Sampoornanand Sports Stadium at Sigra. In view of the construction of the stadium, the best preparations are being made for all the indoor games. Apart from indoor games, gym, spa and a cafeteria will also be present inside the stadium, so that players can focus on their recovery and recovery. This stadium is being constructed keeping in mind the goal of organizing international competitions in future.

Phase-1 development Foundation stone laid by prime minister Narendra Modi on 7th July 2022.

References

External links 
 cricinfo
 Dr Sampurnanda Stadium at CricketArchive

→←

Cricket grounds in Uttar Pradesh
Sports venues in Varanasi
Football venues in Uttar Pradesh
Sports venues completed in 1964
1964 establishments in Uttar Pradesh
20th-century architecture in India